Benjamin Zachary Konop (born March 1, 1976) is a Senior Litigation Counsel in the Office of Enforcement at the Consumer Financial Protection Bureau in Washington, D.C. He also was a law professor and attorney in private practice.

In 2006, Konop was elected to a four-year term as Lucas County (Ohio) Commissioner.

He ran unsuccessfully for Mayor of Toledo, Ohio in 2009. During the campaign a heckler booed him and called him a liar for going back on his pledge to remain in his county commissioner seat until his full term was up. A video of the booing incident went viral on YouTube and was spoofed on Comedy Central's South Park. Konop's interview about his political career and the incident was part of The Huffington Post's 2017 Webby nominated podcast series “Candidate Confessional” with Sam Stein and Jason Cherkis.

Konop also ran unsuccessfully as the Democratic Party candidate in Ohio's 4th congressional district for the United States House of Representatives in 2004.

Early life
Konop received his Bachelor of Arts degree in history from Emory University in Atlanta, Georgia. At Emory he worked at the Washington DC office of Congresswoman Marcy Kaptur. In 2000, Konop earned his law degree from The University of Michigan and afterwards practiced law at Fulbright & Jaworski, LLP. While at the firm, he assisted in the launch of a mentoring program for at-risk junior high school students in Washington, D.C.

Ohio's 4th congressional district candidate
In 2004, Democrat Konop ran against the incumbent Republican U. S. Representative Mike Oxley, of the 4th congressional district of Ohio. Oxley, Chairman of the House Financial Services Committee, had been a congressman since 1981. Though Oxley won, the margin of victory was 48,037 votes; his smallest since 1990.  Konop garnered 41.4% of the votes, highest total ever by an opponent of Oxley, who spent ten times more than Konop in the campaign. He became the first federal candidate of the Democratic Party to win Allen County since 1932. During the debates, Oxley focused on his influence and Konop's inexperience while Konop claimed his opponent abandoned his district and took undue credit for the Sarbanes–Oxley Act.  Following the campaign, Konop served as an adjunct professor of law at Ohio Northern University and a Visiting assistant professor of law at the University of Toledo.  Konop also taught political science at Blufton University.

Lucas County Commissioner
In 2006, Konop campaigned successfully for a Lucas County (Ohio) Commissioner, soundly defeating City Council member George Sarantou by promising to bring fresh perspectives to the county government. Konop won the election by over 40,000 votes, 89,928 to 49,768.

As Commissioner, Konop instituted a countywide microchip scanning program for dogs to help return lost pets to their owners. About 8,000 dogs were scanned for microchips.
Konop also successfully pushed for the resignation of Lucas County Dog Warden due, in large part, to the high kill rate for dogs at the Lucas County Dog Pound. Under mounting pressure, the Dog Warden retired in January 2010. Since the Dog Warden's exit, there have been 407 fewer dogs killed than in 2009 and 939 fewer than in 2008. In November 2009, Konop made a successful motion to adopt a moratorium that banned the Dog Warden from killing puppies, including Pit Bull puppies, at least through 3 months of age. Konop was featured in a documentary, “Guilty ‘Til Proven Innocent” for his work advocating for animal rights.

During his time in office, he also helped to eliminate the use of county no-bid contracts by introducing a resolution that ended the practice of awarding contracts worth more than $5,000 for professional services without a formal bid process. Konop also authored a resolution for greater transparency of politicians’ campaign donors, passed a policy against nepotism in county hiring, and led a community effort to preserve the Children's Wonderland exhibit.

In 2009, Konop objected to the lack of economic and racial diversity on the Lucas County Planning Commission and  gave up his own position on the board to Jim Snodgrass, Jr, an African American UAW factory worker at Jeep

In spring of 2009, Konop revealed his proposal for a $70 million publicly funded scholarship program aimed to increase the number of college-educated county residents without raising taxes. His proposal was rejected by the other two commissioners and Konop cited the resolution's defeat as his greatest disappointment during his service.

Mayor of Toledo candidate
In 2009, while still serving as the Lucas County Commissioner, Konop began his campaign for the office of mayor of Toledo. Opponents raised doubts about Konop's integrity, since in 2006 he pledged to complete the four-year term as commissioner. In defense, Konop cited his greater obligation to bring changes urgently needed in Toledo, which has seen higher unemployment, increase in foreclosure problems, more possibility of police layoffs, and a larger deficit since 2006.

Konop's campaign for mayor received unflattering local and national attention thanks to a YouTube video in which he is repeatedly heckled during a news conference. Konop chose Old West End for the location, at the corner of Winthrop Street and Parkwood Avenue, where his mother grew up. When the filming began, a man who lived nearby named Maxwell Austin intentionally mispronounced Konop's name, labeled him a liar, and booed him. Konop eventually met with Austin to address their common concerns about the city. Konop later participated in a follow-up video intending to spoof the heckler episode which brought him further negative coverage. The events harmed his campaign, and out of the six candidates for mayor, Konop finished in fifth place.
  Konop served the remainder of his term as the Commissioner.

Boo Ben Konop Day
He also has a tribute done in his honor by former national radio icon and current D.C. & Milwaukee radio icon Steve Czaban called "Boo Ben Konop Day" on the day after the MLB All-Star game given that there's nothing else to talk about on that day in regards to sports.

Toledo Blade columnist
Later, Konop was employed as a columnist for the Toledo Blade where he covered the Detroit Tigers, Bob Dylan's first ever concerts in China and Vietnam, and the first 2011 Republican presidential debate in New Hampshire.

Enforcement attorney at the Consumer Financial Protection Bureau (CFPB)
Since 2011, Konop has worked at the CFPB and currently serves as Senior Litigation Counsel in the Office of Enforcememt at the Bureau. At the CFPB, in 2016 Konop was lead Bureau counsel on CFPB vs. Bridgepoint, in which the Bureau took action against Bridgepoint Education, Inc., a for-profit college chain for “deceiving students into taking out private student loans that cost more than advertised.”  Bridgepoint paid a penalty of $8 million to the CFPB and forgave and refunded loans to students totaling $23.5 million.

In addition, Konop is lead Bureau counsel on CFPB vs. RD Legal in which the CFPB and the New York Attorney General filed a lawsuit against RD for allegedly scamming 9/11 Ground Zero first responders and National Football League concussion victims out of money intended to cover their medical costs.

In CFPB vs. Gamber, Konop served as lead Bureau counsel in a lawsuit with the Arkansas Attorney General against businesses brokering contracts offering high-interest credit to veterans, many of them disabled, who agreed to sell their retirement or disability benefits in exchange for a lump-sum payment. Federal law prohibits agreements under which another person acquires the right to receive a veteran's pension payments. The settlement calls for up to a $2.7 million penalty. In a related case where Konop served as lead Bureau counsel, military veterans, many of them disabled, who lost their pensions will receive over $9 million in compensation.

Konop served as lead Bureau counsel in CFPB vs. Village Capital, a lawsuit against a mortgage lender accused of deceiving military veterans into refinancing their mortgages that resulted in a $260,000 fine and full restitution to all veterans who were victims of the deception, and CFPB vs. Top Notch in which the CFPB alleged that the defendants offered deceptive loans to injured former NFL players, victims of the Deepwater Horizon oil spill, and 9/11 first responders. That case resulted in a civil money penalty and lifetime industry bans for the defendants . Konop was lead counsel on CFPB v. Sancho and worked on CFPB vs. Corinthian Colleges and CFPB vs. Genuine Title.  Konop also represented the Bureau in a federal court contempt proceeding against mortgage broker Gary Klopp which resulted in a $525,000 disgorgement order by the court related to violations of a settlement agreement in a mortgage kickback scheme.

Executive Vice President, National Treasury Employee Union at the CFPB (Chapter 335)
In 2012, Konop helped found a chapter of the National Treasury Employee Union at the CFPB. In 2013 he was elected Executive Vice President of the chapter and served on the bargaining committee that negotiated the CFPB's first collective bargaining agreement. In 2014, Konop helped lead the union's efforts to combat race, gender and age bias within the CFPB. This work resulted in a suspension and reorganization of the performance management review system and $5.5 million in back pay being awarded to employees.

On May 21, 2014, the House Financial Services Committee on Oversight conducted a congressional hearing on issues related to discrimination at the CFPB. Konop was subpoenaed by the committee as a witness and testified before Congress, highlighting his union members' concerns regarding pay equity and disparate impact affecting minorities, women, and employees over 40. In his testimony, Konop specifically cited the 2012 Performance Management Ratings (PMR) distribution between management and labor that revealed the disadvantage the bargaining unit employees faced. When the same problems resurfaced in the 2013 PMR, the chapter requested a detailed PMR breakdown based on categories of race, age, and bargaining unit status. The unfavorable results led to grievances, bargaining, and eventual admittance of systemic issues of discrimination within the CFPB's PMR system.

References

External links 
 YouTube Ben Konop Heckled – Video of mayoral campaign heckling incident



1976 births
County commissioners in Ohio
Living people
Ohio Democrats
Alumni of the University of Oxford
Emory University alumni
University of Michigan Law School alumni
University of Toledo faculty
Ohio Northern University faculty
People from Sylvania, Ohio